The 2009 Big League World Series took place from July 29-August 5 in Easley, South Carolina, United States. Santiago,  Dominican Republic defeated Thousand Oaks,  California in the championship game.

Teams

Results

United States Group

International Group

Elimination Round

References

Big League World Series
Big League World Series